The Dinkel is a river in Germany and the Netherlands, left tributary of the Vecht. The Dinkel originates in North Rhine-Westphalia, Germany, between Ahaus and Coesfeld. It flows north to Gronau, crosses the border with the Netherlands (Overijssel), flows through Losser, Denekamp, and recrosses the border to Germany (Lower Saxony). The Dinkel joins the Vechte in Neuenhaus.

Jacob van Ruisdael depicted the landscape of the Dinkel and its watermills near Denekamp in his work Two Watermills and an Open Sluice near Singraven. These watermills still exist. 

In the Netherlands the river gave name to the village of Overdinkel and to the municipality of Dinkelland. 

Near Denekamp some of the waters of the Dinkel are used to regulate the levels of the Almelo-Nordhorn canal.

Gallery

See also
List of rivers of the Netherlands
List of rivers of North Rhine-Westphalia
List of rivers of Lower Saxony

References

Rivers of North Rhine-Westphalia
Rivers of Lower Saxony
Rivers of Overijssel
Dinkelland
Losser
Rivers of the Netherlands
Rivers of Germany
International rivers of Europe